Greg Lawson is an American songwriter and record producer, who has written lyrics for Chicago: Music from the Miramax Motion Picture from the movie Chicago. He is known for soundtracks songs "Love Is a Crime" and "He Had It Comin'" from Chicago, as well as for Jennifer Lopez's "Love Don't Cost A Thing", and for Anastacia tracks including "Paid My Dues" and "Love Is a Crime".

"OopDeeWopDee", which was co-written and produced by Lawson, reached number 49 in Billboard magazine's chart.

Awards and recognition
 Grammy Award winning compilation album, Chicago: Music from the Miramax Motion Picture
 Nomination for the song "Love Is a Crime" for Satellite Award for Best Original Song

References

Living people
Record producers from California
Songwriters from California
Year of birth missing (living people)